Gemmiger is a genus of bacteria from the family of Ruminococcaceae.

References

 

Eubacteriales
Monotypic bacteria genera
Bacteria genera